Lý Công Hoàng Anh (born 1 September 1999) is a Vietnamese professional footballer who plays as a central midfielder for V.League 1 club Topenland Bình Định and the Vietnam national team.

Career statistics

International

Honours
Hồng Lĩnh Hà Tĩnh
V.League 2: 2019
Vietnam U23
Southeast Asian Games: 2021

References

External links
 

1999 births
Living people
Vietnamese footballers
Vietnam international footballers
Association football forwards
Binh Dinh FC players
V.League 1 players
People from Hòa Bình Province
Competitors at the 2021 Southeast Asian Games
Southeast Asian Games competitors for Vietnam
Southeast Asian Games gold medalists for Vietnam
Southeast Asian Games medalists in football